Angus Pattie (born 14 September 1964) is a Fijian sailor. He competed in the Tornado event at the 1996 Summer Olympics.

References

External links
 

1964 births
Living people
Fijian male sailors (sport)
Olympic sailors of Fiji
Sailors at the 1996 Summer Olympics – Tornado
Place of birth missing (living people)